Election day or polling day is the day on which general elections are held. In many countries, general elections are always held on a Saturday or Sunday, to enable as many voters as possible to participate; while in other countries elections are always held on a weekday. However, some countries, or regions within a country, which hold elections on a weekday declare election day a public holiday. Countries which permit absentee ballots, early ballots or postal votes to be cast by mail before the election avoid the problem altogether by enabling voters to vote on a day that is more convenient to them.

Sundays are the most common day for elections, but this is less true in the Anglosphere; Saturdays are used in New Zealand and Australia, and weekdays for the United States, United Kingdom, and Canada. This is partially due to the influence of Protestantism, which historically set restrictions on activities other than church-going during the Sabbath (usually considered as falling on a Sunday).

An election day usually culminates in an election night when the results of the election are tallied and winners are announced.

Election day by country/territory

Other bodies
Elections to the European Parliament take place over a period of four days (i.e., Thursday through to Sunday), according to the election days of the EU members states (as listed above). There are some exceptions; as Wednesday was not covered by the available dates, the Netherlands holds elections on Thursday, while Denmark holds elections on Sunday. Countries that hold the ballot before Sunday are not permitted to announce results until all other countries have finished voting.

See also
 Early voting

Notes

References

Elections
Time in government